Love's Old Sweet Song is a 1933 British romance film directed by Manning Haynes and starring John Stuart, Joan Wyndham and William Freshman. It was made at Cricklewood Studios. Like many Butcher's Film Service productions of the era, it takes its name from a well-known song.

Cast
 John Stuart as Paul Kingslake  
 Joan Wyndham as Mary Dean  
 William Freshman as Jimmy Croft  
 Julie Suedo as Iris Sinclair  
 Ronald Ward as Eric Kingslake 
 Charles Courtney  
 Barbara Everest as Nurse  
 Dora Levis 
 Moore Marriott as Old Tom  
 Ivor Maxwell as Rodger Kingslake  
 Picot Schooling 
 Malcolm Tod as Announcer  
 Marie Wright as Sarah

References

Bibliography
 Low, Rachael. Filmmaking in 1930s Britain. George Allen & Unwin, 1985.
 Wood, Linda. British Films, 1927-1939. British Film Institute, 1986.

External links

Love's Old Sweet Song sheet music in Choral Public Domain Library (CPDL)

1933 films
British romance films
1930s romance films
Films shot at Cricklewood Studios
Films directed by H. Manning Haynes
British black-and-white films
1930s English-language films
1930s British films